"It's a Shame" is the fourth and final single released in January 1993 by American duo Kris Kross from their debut album, Totally Krossed Out (1992). It is the least successful of the four singles, as it did not chart on the Billboard Hot 100. However, it did manage to reach number 11 on the Billboard Hot Rap Singles chart and number 55 on the Hot R&B/Hip-Hop Songs chart and number 31 on the UK Singles Chart. The song was written and produced by Jermaine Dupri. The group had performed "It's a Shame" on numerous television shows such as A Different World.

Critical reception
Larry Flick from Billboard wrote, "Preteen rap duo drops its hardest-hitting single to date. On-target rhymes about the rigors of growing up in the midst of violence and poverty take on a heavier-than-usual tone when rapped by a youngster's voice. Insinuating, scratch-happy hip-hop beats are drenched in radio-friendly synths and hand claps. Could trigger some much-needed street credibility." In his weekly UK chart commentary, James Masterton said, "Sadly this new single may do little to convince Britain that Daddy Mac and Mac Daddy are little more than novelties." A reviewer from People Magazine commented, "While the koncept may be kute, the kids sound anything but innocent as they delineate brutal urban realities".

Music video
A music video was produced to promote the single, directed by Rich Murray.

Track listing
"It's a Shame" (7" Remix)- 3:42 
"It's a Shame" (Extended Remix)- 6:41 
"Jump" (Steve Anderson Extended Remix)- 6:17 
"Jump" (Supercat Dessork Mix)- 3:52

Charts

References

External links

1992 songs
1993 singles
Kris Kross songs
Ruffhouse Records singles
Songs written by Jermaine Dupri
Song recordings produced by Jermaine Dupri